Prachaksinlapakhom is a district (amphoe) in central Udon Thani province, northeastern Thailand.

Geography
Neighboring districts are (from the north clockwise) Nong Han, Ku Kaeo, Kumphawapi, and Mueang Udon Thani.

History
The minor district (king amphoe) was established on 1 June 1997 by splitting it from Kumphawapi district. The creation became effective on 1 July 1997.

On 15 May 2007, all 81 minor districts were upgraded to full districts. With publication in the Royal Gazette on 24 August, the upgrade became official.

Administration

Central administration 
Prachaksinlapakhom is divided into three sub-districts (tambons), which are further subdivided into 41 administrative villages (mubans).

Local administration 
There are three sub-district administrative organizations (SAO) in the district:
 Na Muang consisting of sub-district Na Muang.
 Huai Sam Phat consisting of sub-district Huai Sam Phat.
 Um Chan consisting of sub-district Um Chan.

Economy
Huai Sam Phat and Na Muang Sub-districts are among five Udon Thani sub-districts to harbour mining operations of the Udon North potash mine, although the mine has met with local resistance.

References

External links
amphoe.com

Prachaksinlapakhom